The Chile Open (also known as the Chile Dove Men+Care Open for sponsorship reasons) is a professional men's tennis tournament played on outdoor red clay courts in Santiago, Chile. The tournament was originally founded as the Chile International Championships in 1930. In its history it was held alternately in Viña del Mar city and in 2010, Colina. It is part of the ATP Tour 250 of the Association of Tennis Professionals (ATP) Tour and part of the four-tournament Golden Swing.

History
In 1992, Brazil suspended its three ATP tournaments. When the ATP resolved to keep these tournaments in Latin America, brothers Jaime and Álvaro Fillol decided to buy the organizing rights to hold one of these events in Chile. The first edition was held in Santiago in November 1993. In 1999, it was not held, due to the ATP's decision to reschedule the event to February 2000. In 2001, the tournament was moved to Viña del Mar. The event moved back to Santiago in 2010, eventually returning to Viña del Mar in 2012.

For the 2007 edition, the tournament switched to a 24-player round robin format. After problems with this format were discovered in other tournaments, the ATP decided to revert all round-robin events to the old play-off format. Thus, from the year 2008, the tournament was back to its old 32-player draw scheme.

After many sponsorship renewing attempts, the tournament was folded mid-year after the 2014 edition and the tournament moved to Ecuador.

Many top-ten players participated in this tournament, including Mats Wilander, Jim Courier, Jiří Novák, Marcelo Ríos, Carlos Moyà, Gustavo Kuerten, Àlex Corretja, Tommy Haas, Magnus Norman, Sergi Bruguera, Guillermo Coria, David Nalbandian, Gastón Gaudio, Fernando González, Tommy Robredo, Nicolás Lapentti, Álbert Costa, Alberto Berasategui, Emilio Sánchez, Guillermo Cañas, Mariano Puerta, Nicolás Massú, David Ferrer, Fernando Verdasco, Juan Mónaco, Rafael Nadal, and Félix Mantilla.

On 15 October 2019, Brasil Open organisers announced the date the tournament will return to Santiago for Chile Open comeback in 2020. On 19 November 2019, despite Chilean protests, ATP confirmed the event once again.

Finals

Singles

Doubles

See also
 Chilean Open
 Golden Swing
 List of tennis tournaments

References

External links
  
 ATP tournament profile

 
Tennis tournaments in Chile
Clay court tennis tournaments
Recurring sporting events established in 1993
Recurring sporting events disestablished in 2014